William Frederick Weston Hinton (25 December 1895 – 1976) was an English professional footballer who played for Swindon Town, Bolton Wanderers, Tottenham Hotspur.

Football career 
Hinton joined his local club Swindon Town but didn't make a first team appearance. In 1920 the goalkeeper joined Bolton Wanderers where he played in 34 matches between 1920–23. Hinton signed for Tottenham Hotspur in 1924 where he featured in 64 matches in all competitions for the Lilywhites. After leaving White Hart Lane he returned to Swindon Town in 1928 where he ended his playing career.

References 

1895 births
1976 deaths
Sportspeople from Swindon
English footballers
English Football League players
Association football goalkeepers
Swindon Town F.C. players
Bolton Wanderers F.C. players
Tottenham Hotspur F.C. players